This is a list of museums in Cleveland and non-profit and university art galleries.

See also List of museums in Ohio for other museums in Cuyahoga County, Ohio and the rest of the state.

Museums

Defunct museums 
 Cleveland Health Museum, AKA HealthSpace Cleveland, merged in 2007 with the Cleveland Museum of Natural History
 Lake Shore Electric Railway
 Little Italy Heritage Museum, closed in 2007
 Mill Creek Falls History Center, operated by the Slavic Village Historical Society

See also 
 List of museums in the United States

References 

Museums
Cleveland
museums